3α-Androstanediol glucuronide (3α-ADG) is a metabolite formed from human androgens; compounds involved in the development and maintenance of sexual characteristics. It is formed by the glucuronidation of both dihydrotestosterone and testosterone, and has been proposed as means of measuring androgenic activity.

In women the adrenal steroids, dehydroepiandrosterone sulfate, androstenedione and dehydroepiandrosterone are the major precursors of plasma 3α-ADG, accounting for almost the totality of circulating 3α-ADG. Levels of 3α-ADG decrease significantly with age.

3α-ADG is used as a marker of target tissue cellular action. 3α-ADG correlates with level of 5α-reductase activity (testosterone and 3α-androstanediol to dihydrotestosterone) in the skin. Concentrations of 3α-ADG are associated with the level of cutaneous androgen metabolism.

See also
 3β-Androstanediol
 Androsterone glucuronide
 Etiocholanolone glucuronide

References

5α-Reduced steroid metabolites
Androstanes
Human metabolites
Glucuronide esters